Burgon is a surname. Notable people with the surname include:

Archie Burgon (1912–1994), professional footballer
Colin Burgon (born 1948), British Labour Party politician, Member of Parliament for Elmet 1997–2010
Geoffrey Burgon (1941–2010), British composer notable for his television and film themes
James Burgon Valentine (born 1978), American musician
John Burgon (1813–1888), English Anglican divine, became Dean of Chichester Cathedral in 1876
Richard Burgon, British Labour Party politician, Member of Parliament (MP) for Leeds East since 2015 general
Sid Burgon (born 1936), British comics artist

See also
Burgon Group, a group of Attic black-figure vase painters active in the middle third of the sixth century B.C.
Burgon vase, an amphora from the Burgon group, the earliest known Panathenaic amphora
Burgon Society, founded in 2000 for the study and promotion of academical dress to preserve its history and to advise in its correct usage
Bourgon